Mohamed Malal Sy Savané (born 30 September 1968) is a Guinean middle-distance runner. He competed in the men's 800 metres at the 1992 Summer Olympics. His younger brother Amadou Sy Savané is an Olympic sprinter.

References

1968 births
Living people
Athletes (track and field) at the 1992 Summer Olympics
Guinean male middle-distance runners
Olympic athletes of Guinea
Place of birth missing (living people)